The Law of Life (Russian: Закон жизни) is a 1940 Soviet drama film directed by Boris Ivanov and Aleksandr Stolper and starring Daniil Sagal, Aleksandr Lukyanov and Oswald Glazunov. Despite its strong endorsement of communist ideology, the film was fiercely attacked in Pravda and withdrawn from release.

Cast

References

Bibliography 
 Rollberg, Peter. Historical Dictionary of Russian and Soviet Cinema. Scarecrow Press, 2008.

External links 
 

1940 films
Soviet drama films
1940 drama films
1940s Russian-language films
Films directed by Aleksandr Stolper
Soviet black-and-white films
Films directed by Boris Ivanov